The Lure of the Wild is a 1925 American silent dramatic thriller film directed by Frank R. Strayer and starring Alan Roscoe, Jane Novak, and Lightning the Dog. It was produced and released by Columbia Pictures.

Plot
As described in a film magazine review, Jim Belmont, believing is wife Agnes loves Gordon Daniels, leaves for the Canadian wilderness with his daughter Cuddles and his dog Shep. He is killed by Mike Murdock at Daniels' instigation. Shep aids and protects Cuddles, who was abandoned to the mercy of the elements by her father's death. The dog fetches the trapper Poleon Dufresne, who sends for Agnes. She is followed by Daniels. Murdock confesses his crime to Dufresne. Shep saves Agnes from attack by Daniels and herds him to a cliff, where Daniels falls to his death. Agnes and Dufresne then wed.

Cast
Jane Novak as Agnes Belmont
Alan Roscoe as Jim Belmont
Lightning the Dog as Shep the Dog
Billie Jean as Baby Cuddles (aka Billie Jeane Phelps)
Richard Tucker as Gordon Daniels
Mario Carillo as Poleon Dufresne
Pat Harmon as Mike Murdock

Preservation
A print survives in the Library of Congress collection and also in the Library and Archives Canada.

References

External links

Lobby poster
Lobby poster

1925 films
American silent feature films
Films directed by Frank R. Strayer
Columbia Pictures films
American black-and-white films
American thriller drama films
1920s thriller drama films
1925 drama films
1920s American films
Silent American drama films
Silent thriller films